Mount Aspiring National Park is in the Southern Alps of the South Island of New Zealand, north of Fiordland National Park, situated in Otago and Westland regions. The park forms part of the Te Wahipounamu World Heritage site.

Geography
Other prominent peaks within the park include Mount Pollux, elevation , and Mount Brewster, elevation .

The Haast Pass, one of the three principal road routes over the Southern Alps, crosses the north-eastern corner of the park.

History

Landsborough Station added
In April 2005 the Nature Heritage Fund purchased private land in the Landsborough River valley as an addition to the park.

Milford Sound tunnel proposal
In 2006, the Milford Dart Company asked the Department of Conservation to amend the Mt Aspiring National Park Management Plan to allow an additional road within the park for a bus tunnel, the so-called Milford Tunnel, from the Routeburn Road to the Hollyford Valley to take tourists to Milford Sound. The tunnel would have established a connection via Glenorchy and would have significantly reduced the current return travel time from Queenstown to Milford Sound of 9 hours.

In December 2007, the New Zealand Conservation Authority declined to adopt the amendment to the Management Plan. The Conservation Authority considered the proposed road would not add to the use and enjoyment of Mount Aspiring National Park and that the adverse effects of construction and use of the road in the National Park would outweigh any benefits.

The proposal gained approval in principle by the Department of Conservation in 2011, but was rejected by the Minister of Conservation, Nick Smith, in July 2013.  Smith stated that "the proposal was beyond what was appropriate for a World Heritage Area." The managing director of the company behind the proposal stated that he was "disappointed of course. National trying to out-green the greens. Going skiing."

Mining proposal
In 2009 the National-led government of New Zealand indicated that Mount Aspiring National Park may be opened up to mining. Around 20% of the total area of the park, mainly in the western portions around the Red Hill Range, and the north eastern parts, could be removed from the park and mined. Prospectors here are particularly interested in carbonatite deposits including rare earth elements and tungsten. The Green Party has warned that the park is one of New Zealand's main tourism drawcards, and that mining here could do significant damage to the country's image.

Visitor centre 

The Mount Aspiring National Park visitor centre is located in Wānaka on the Corner of Ardmore St and Ballentyne Rd.

Tramping and hiking
Popular tramping tracks in the park include:
 Gillespie Pass circuit
 Mātukituki Valley
 Routeburn Track
 Rees-Dart circuit

See also
 National parks of New Zealand
 Forest parks of New Zealand
 Regional parks of New Zealand
 Protected areas of New Zealand
 Conservation in New Zealand
 Tramping in New Zealand

References

External links

 Mount Aspiring National Park at the Department of Conservation

 
Protected areas of Otago
Protected areas established in 1964
1964 establishments in New Zealand
National parks of New Zealand
Parks in Otago